Grace Kelly (also known as The Grace Kelly Story) is a 1983 American made-for-television biographical film starring Cheryl Ladd as Grace Kelly, Princess of Monaco. The film originally aired on ABC on February 21, 1983.

The producers claimed that Princess Grace assisted for several weeks with the films preproduction before her unexpected death in 1982.

Cast
Cheryl Ladd as Grace Kelly
Christina Applegate as Young Grace Kelly
Lloyd Bridges as Jack Kelly
Diane Ladd as Margaret Kelly
Alejandro Rey as Oleg Cassini
Ian McShane as Prince Rainier of Monaco
Marta DuBois as Rita Gam

Critical reception
The New York Times wrote that Cheryl Ladd, "comes reasonably close to being as beautiful as the original," however regretted "the sense of stately awe and suffocating propriety that seeps through the project. Grace Kelly will offend nobody. Unfortunately, it's not likely to interest too many people, either"; Allmovie agreed that the film "tones down the darker aspects of its subject, and the film is infinitely more tasteful than most other TV biographies of the same period, even when dealing with Princess Grace's untimely death";  whereas the Radio Times wrote "There's much that this TV movie glosses over, particularly with regard to her love life, but director Anthony Page successfully conveys the pressures placed on Kelly by her privileged background and her international fame."

References

External links

1983 television films
1983 films
1980s biographical films
ABC network original films
Cultural depictions of Grace Kelly
American biographical films
American television films
Films set in the 1950s
Films set in the 1960s
Films set in the 1970s
Films set in the 1980s
Films set in Monaco
Films directed by Anthony Page
Biographical films about royalty
Films about princesses
1980s American films